The Battle of Cerro del Borrego took place on 13 June 1862 in the vicinity of the current municipality of Orizaba in the state of Veracruz, Mexico. It was fought between the Mexican republican army under General Jesús Gonzalez Ortega and troops of the Second Mexican Empire during the Second French intervention in Mexico.

Before General González Ortega's troops incorporation to General Zaragoza's troops in San Andrés Chalchicomula, he received orders to pass through Perote in order to reach the northern part of Orizaba heading to La Perla and then occupy Cerro del Borrego, near to Orizaba. During the night of June 14, 1862, the Zacatecas division was discovered and moved away from its position by French troops forcing it to retreat.

References 

Conflicts in 1862
1862 in Mexico
1862 in the French colonial empire
Battles involving France
Battles of the Second French intervention in Mexico
June 1862 events